Bradley D. Heidt is a Canadian curler from Kerrobert, Saskatchewan. He is a two-time provincial champion.

Career
In 1982, Heidt and his team of Wayne Charteris, John Whetter and Warren Rechenmacher finished 5-6 at the Labatt Brier. He won his second provincial championship 13 years later, sending him to the 1995 Labatt Brier. His team of Mark Dacey, Charteris and Dan Ormsby finished the round robin in second place with an 8-3 record. He then lost to Manitoba's Kerry Burtnyk in the final, to finish second.

Heidt remains skipping one of the top teams in Saskatchewan. He has won six World Curling Tour events in his career.

Heidt is also a former provincial mixed champion and in 2010, he won his first provincial seniors title (over 50).

References

External links
 

Curlers from Saskatchewan
Living people
Canadian male curlers
Year of birth missing (living people)
Canada Cup (curling) participants